Manchester and Salford Universities Air Squadron, abbreviated MASUAS, forms part of the Royal Air Force Volunteer Reserve. MASUAS is one of fifteen University Air Squadrons that are spread out across Great Britain and it recruits from the universities in Manchester (University of Manchester and Manchester Metropolitan University) and Salford University.

References

Military units and formations established in 1941
Organisations based in Merseyside
Royal Air Force university air squadrons
University of Manchester
University of Salford